Richard Thomas (1792 – 30 May 1881) was an English cricketer active in the early 1830s. Born at Chatham, Kent at some point in 1792, Thomas made five appearances in first-class cricket for four teams.

He made his first-class debut for the Gentlemen of Kent against the Marylebone Cricket Club at Lord's in June 1833, before playing for the Marylebone Cricket Club against the Gentlemen of Kent in August of that year. He made two appearances for England against Sussex in August and September 1833, before making a final first-class appearance for Kent against England in 1835. He scored 28 runs in his five matches, top-scoring with 9 not out.

He died at Eyhorne House, Hollingbourne, Kent on 30 May 1881.

References

External links

1792 births
1881 deaths
Sportspeople from Chatham, Kent
English cricketers
Gentlemen of Kent cricketers
Marylebone Cricket Club cricketers
Non-international England cricketers
Kent cricketers
People from Hollingbourne